Morten Kristian Johansen Staubo (born 6 May 1959) is a Norwegian speed skater. He was born in Oslo, and represented the club Oslo SK. He competed in short track speed skating at the 1994 Winter Olympics.

References

External links

1959 births
Living people
Sportspeople from Oslo
Norwegian male speed skaters
Norwegian male short track speed skaters
Olympic short track speed skaters of Norway
Short track speed skaters at the 1994 Winter Olympics